The 1993–94 season was the 92nd in the history of the Western Football League.

The league champions for the first time in their history were Tiverton Town, who finished the season unbeaten. The champions of Division One were Barnstaple Town.

Final tables

Premier Division
The Premier Division was reduced from 20 to 18 clubs after Clevedon Town were promoted to the Southern League, Chard Town and Dawlish Town were relegated to the First Division, and Plymouth Argyle Reserves and Torquay United Reserves also left. Three clubs joined:

Calne Town, runners-up in the First Division.
Crediton United, third-placed in the First Division.
Odd Down Athletic, champions of the First Division, changing their name from Odd Down F.C.

First Division
The First Division was reduced from 21 clubs to 20, after Calne Town, Crediton United and Odd Down were promoted to the Premier Division, and Melksham Town left the league. Three new clubs joined:

Chard Town, relegated from the Premier Division.
Dawlish Town, relegated from the Premier Division.
Pewsey Vale, promoted from the Wiltshire County League.

References

1993-94
6